Dendrocerus is a genus of megaspilid wasps in the family Megaspilidae. There are more than 100 described species in Dendrocerus.

See also
 List of Dendrocerus species

References

External links

 

Parasitic wasps
Ceraphronoidea
Hymenoptera genera
Taxa named by Julius Theodor Christian Ratzeburg
Articles created by Qbugbot